The women's 400 metres hurdles at the 2012 African Championships in Athletics was held at the Stade Charles de Gaulle on 30 June and 1 July.

Medalists

Records

Schedule

Results

Round 1
First 2 in each heat (Q) and 2 best performers (q) advance to the Final.

Final

References

Results

Hurdles 400 Women
400 metres hurdles at the African Championships in Athletics
2012 in women's athletics